Agapanthia zappii is a species of beetle in the family Cerambycidae. It was described by Sama in 1987.

References

zappii
Beetles described in 1987